Geza Eros is a male former international table tennis player from Romania and later Hungary. 

He won a bronze medal at the 1937 World Table Tennis Championships in the mixed doubles with Angelica Rozeanu.

See also
 List of table tennis players
 List of World Table Tennis Championships medalists

References

Living people
Year of birth missing (living people)
Romanian female table tennis players
World Table Tennis Championships medalists